Myelin basic protein (MBP) is a protein believed to be important in the process of myelination of nerves in the nervous system. The myelin sheath is a multi-layered membrane, unique to the nervous system, that functions as an insulator to greatly increase the velocity of axonal impulse conduction. MBP  maintains the correct structure of myelin, interacting with the lipids in the myelin membrane.

MBP was initially sequenced in 1971 after isolation from bovine myelin membranes. MBP knockout mice called shiverer mice were subsequently developed and characterized in the early 1980s. Shiverer mice exhibit decreased amounts of CNS myelination and a progressive disorder characterized by tremors, seizures, and early death. The human gene for MBP is on chromosome 18; the protein localizes to the CNS and to various cells of the hematopoietic lineage.

The pool of MBP in the central nervous system is very diverse, with several splice variants being expressed and a large number of post-translational modifications on the protein, which include phosphorylation, methylation, deamidation, and citrullination. These forms differ by the presence or the absence of short (10 to 20 residues) peptides in various internal locations in the sequence. In general, the major form of MBP is a protein of about 18.5 Kd (170 residues).

In melanocytic cell types, MBP gene expression may be regulated by MITF.

Gene expression 

The protein encoded by the classic MBP gene is a major constituent of the myelin sheath of oligodendrocytes and Schwann cells in the nervous system. However, MBP-related transcripts are also present in the bone marrow and the immune system. These mRNAs arise from the long MBP gene (otherwise called "Golli-MBP") that contains 3 additional exons located upstream of the classic MBP exons. Alternative splicing from the Golli and the MBP transcription start sites gives rise to 2 sets of MBP-related transcripts and gene products. The Golli mRNAs contain 3 exons unique to Golli-MBP, spliced in-frame to 1 or more MBP exons. They encode hybrid proteins that have N-terminal Golli aa sequence linked to MBP aa sequence. The second family of transcripts contain only MBP exons and produce the well-characterized myelin basic proteins. This complex gene structure is conserved among species, suggesting that the MBP transcription unit is an integral part of the Golli transcription unit and that this arrangement is important for the function and/or regulation of these genes. At protein level, the concentration of MBP in the CNS is tenfold higher in sections of white matter compared with cerebral cortex.

Structure 

Myelin basic protein has been classified as an intrinsically disordered protein that has no stable secondary structure in solution. Like most IDPs, it has a high net charge and a low mean hydrophobicity, minimizing the hydrophobic effect that drives traditional protein folding. It does contain some exceptions to normal IDP amino acid content. For example, MBP has more arginine and less glutamic acid than most IDPs. However, this is likely because those changes are necessary for MBP to be sufficiently basic and positively charged to correctly interact with the membrane. Notably, MBP has been shown to adopt a more stable secondary structure on interaction with lipids. NMR and Cys-specific spin labeling experiments have predicted this structure to contain beta sheet and regions of amphipathic helix.

As implied by its name, myelin basic protein is significantly basic, with an isoelectric point of 10. It is thought to associate with the cell membrane through electrostatic interactions between its positive charges and negatively charged phospholipid heads of the plasma membrane. It can undergo a large variety of post-translational modifications, creating various charge isomers known as C1-C6 or C8. These modifications include phosphorylation, methylation, deamidation, citrullination, ADP-ribosylation, and N-terminal acylation . C1 is the least modified, while C8 is the most distinct, containing 6-11 additional citrullinations. Since each of these decreases its positive charge, C8 has the smallest net positive charge of the isomers. Alternations in these post-translational modifications have been associated with demyelinating diseases. Notably, MBP isolated from individuals with multiple sclerosis have had a higher degree of citrullination and a smaller positive charge. In a rare, severe form of MS known as Marburg's syndrome, the citrullination was even more extensive.

Role in disease 

Interest in MBP has centered on its role in demyelinating diseases, in particular, multiple sclerosis (MS). The target antigen of the autoimmune response in MS has not yet been identified.  However, several studies have shown a role for antibodies against MBP in the pathogenesis of MS. Some studies have linked a genetic predisposition to MS to the MBP gene, though a majority have not.

A "molecular mimicry" hypothesis of multiple sclerosis has been suggested, in which T cells are, in essence, confusing MBP with human herpesvirus-6. Researchers in the United States created a synthetic peptide with a sequence identical to that of an HHV-6 peptide. Elevated levels of MBP have been found in the cerebrospinal fluid of patients with HIV infections and signs of encephalopathy, and although MBP does not seem to be a sensitive diagnostic marker of HIV encephalopathy, it has been suggested that it may serve a role as a prognostic indicator of disease progression. 
It is able to show that T cells were activated by this peptide. These activated T cells also recognized and initiated an immune response against a synthetically created peptide sequence that is identical to part of human MBP. During their research, they found that the levels of these cross-reactive T cells are significantly elevated in multiple sclerosis patients.

Some research has shown that inoculating an animal with MBP to generate an MBP-specific immune response against it increases blood–brain barrier permeability. Permeability is enhanced when the animal is inoculated against non-specific proteins.

A targeted immune response to MBP has been implicated in lethal rabies infection. The inoculation of MBP generates increases the permeability of the blood–brain barrier (BBB), allowing immune cells to enter the brain, the primary site of rabies virus replication. In a study of mice infected with Silver-haired bat rabies virus (SHBRV), the mortality rate of mice treated with MBP improved 20%-30% over the untreated control group. It is significant to note that healthy uninfected mice treated with MBP showed an increase in mortality rate between 0% and 40%.

Interactions 

Myelin basic protein has been shown to interact in vivo with proteolipid protein 1, and in vitro with calmodulin, actin, tropomyosin, tubulin, clathrin, 2',3'-cyclic-nucleotide 3'-phosphodiesterase and multiple molecules of the immune system.

References

Further reading

External links 

 

Peripheral membrane proteins
Human proteins
Protein families